Andrea Olivero (born 24 February 1970) is the Italian Vice Minister for Agricultural, Food and Forestry Policies and a senator of the Italian Republic. He has been President of the Christian Associations of Italian Workers  from 2006 to 2012.

Biography 

After graduating from the University of Turin, he became a teacher in the province of Cuneo. In 1992 he was one of the promoters of Christian Associations of Italian Workers (ACLI) of Cuneo in 1994 and promotes the establishment of the Emmaus Community of Boves.
From 1997 to 2004 he was the President of ACLI Cuneo. In 2002, founder and president of Together to educate for the management of Catholic schools in the Diocese of Cuneo.
In 2004 he was elected National Vice President ACLI, and since 2006 he was the president until his resignation on 19 December 2012, after the resignation of his predecessor Luigi Bobba. From December 2008, he act as Spokesman of the Third Sector Forum.

Political career 

In 2013, he joined Civic Choice (SC). In the 2013 general election he was elected senator on With Monti for Italy coalition's lists, composed by SC, Union of the Centre (UdC) and Future and Freedom (FLI). On 12 March 2013, Mario Monti, SC acting president, appointed Olivero as provisional political coordinator of Civic Choice. At the first party congress held on 16 May 2013, he was re-elected SC coordinator.

References 

|-

|-

|-

1970 births
Living people
People from Cuneo
Civic Choice politicians
Populars for Italy politicians
Solidary Democracy politicians
Senators of Legislature XVII of Italy
Politicians of Piedmont
University of Turin alumni